The Men's 100 metres T51 event at the 2012 Summer Paralympics took place at the London Olympic Stadium on 3 September.

Records
Prior to the competition, the existing World and Paralympic records were as follows.

Results
There were no heats for this event. The final was competed on 3 September 2012 at 19:10.

Final

 
Q = qualified by place. q = qualified by time. WR = World Record. RR = Regional Record. PB = Personal Best. SB = Seasonal Best.

References

Athletics at the 2012 Summer Paralympics
2012 in men's athletics